Crispus was a Caesar of the Roman Empire.

Crispus may also refer to:

Gaius Sallustius Crispus, generally known simply as Sallust (86 BC-c. 35 BC), Roman historian and politician
Lucius Junius Quintus Vibius Crispus, 1st century Roman politician and wit
Crispus of Chalcedon, 1st century Christian martyr and bishop of Chalcedon
Crispus Attucks, (c. 1723–1770), the first of five people killed in the Boston Massacre  
Crispus Kiyonga (born 1952), Ugandan Minister of Defence and physician
Crispus Allen, a DC Comics character

See also
Crespi